Aba Subregon was a subregion in Fejér County, Hungary. Its center was Aba. It was the only subregion where the center is not a town or a city.

Settlements

Subregions of Hungary
Geography of Fejér County